, nicknamed Haku,  is a Japanese professional   basketball player who plays for Mitsubishi Electric Koalas of the Women's Japan Basketball League . She also plays for Japan women's national 3x3 team.

Personal
Her father Tsuyoshi Nishioka is a former professional baseball pitcher.

References

1997 births
Living people
3x3 basketball players at the 2020 Summer Olympics
Japanese women's 3x3 basketball players
Japanese women's basketball players
Olympic 3x3 basketball players of Japan
Sportspeople from Nara Prefecture